Vance Elmer McIlree (October 14, 1897 – May 6, 1959) was a pitcher in Major League Baseball. He pitched for the Washington Senators in one game in 1921.

References

External links

1897 births
1959 deaths
Major League Baseball pitchers
Washington Senators (1901–1960) players
Baseball players from Iowa